Borna Ćorić was the defending champion but chose not to participate this year.

Seeds

Draw

Finals

Top half

Bottom half

References
 Main Draw
 Qualifying Draw

Turk Telecom Izmir Cup - Singles
2014 Singles